The Airspeed AS.8 Viceroy was a British racing version of the Airspeed AS.6 Envoy built by Airspeed (1934) Limited at Portsmouth.  The Viceroy was built to order for Captain T. Neville Stack and Sydney Lewis Turner, to compete in the England-Australia MacRobertson Air Race. Only one aircraft, registered G-ACMU, was built.

Design and development
The Viceroy was a modified Airspeed Envoy.  Modifications included:

More powerful, supercharged Armstrong Siddeley Cheetah VI engines in long chord, smooth NACA cowlings
Strengthened main landing gear to allow higher weight takeoff
An auxiliary petrol tank, capacity was 270 Imp gallon/1,227 litres installed in the aft fuselage
Narrowed fuselage without passenger windows

Operational history
The Airspeed Viceroy started the race from RAF Mildenhall, England, but after several reliability problems including with the mainwheel brakes, it was withdrawn from the race at Athens.  The pilots concluded that it would be unsafe to proceed and they would probably be unable to finish the race. An acrimonious set of legal actions followed, with the pilots complaining that the aircraft, beset by multiple problems, had been "not really ready". Airspeed contested the action, and eventually the aircraft was returned to them without refund. The aircraft returned to Portsmouth and was then stored until July 1936 when it was sold the following month by the French concern, SFTA and departed to France en route to the Spanish Civil War.

Documentation regarding the Viceroy's service with the Spanish Republican Air Force is sketchy.  The intention was to convert the aircraft into a bomber and photographs suggest that it did receive new markings and was stationed at an airbase, but further information is not available as to its actual service.

Operators

Spanish Republican Air Force

Specifications

See also

References

 The Illustrated Encyclopedia of Aircraft (Part Work 1982-1985). Orbis Publishing. 
 Jackson, A.J. British Civil Aircraft since 1919 Volume 1. London: Putnam, 1974. .

External links

 MacRobertson air race 1934 entrants
 Tom Campbell Black
 75th. Anniversary of the Great Air Race October 1934 Tom Campbell Black

Viceroy
1930s British sport aircraft
Low-wing aircraft
Aircraft first flown in 1934
Twin piston-engined tractor aircraft